Malakhovo is a rural locality (a village) in Bereznikovskoye Rural Settlement, Sobinsky District, Vladimir Oblast, Russia. The population was 9 as of 2010.

Geography 
Malakhovo is located 34 km southeast of Sobinka (the district's administrative centre) by road. Zhabino is the nearest rural locality.

References 

Rural localities in Sobinsky District